Amlajorah is one of the oldest village in Kanksa CD Block in Durgapur subdivision of Paschim Bardhaman district in the state of West Bengal, India.

Geography
It is about 8 km from Durgapur.

Transport
Rajbandh (part of Howrah-Delhi main line) is the nearest railway station, which is approximately 2km away from Amlajorah. It is also well connected by bus from Durgapur and Panagarh.

NH 19 (old numbering NH 2)/ Grand Trunk Road passes approximately 2.5km away from the village.

Kazi Nazrul Islam Airport at Andal is the nearest domestic airport.

Police station
P.S is Kanksa which has jurisdiction over Kanksa CD Block. The area covered is 280 km2.

Education
Amlajorah has one Higher secondary and one primary school.

Nearest engineering college is Durgapur Institute of Advanced Technology and Management.

Gouri Devi Institute of Medical Sciences is a medical college with 300-bedded multi-speciality health care venture, located approx 2.5km from Amlajorah.

References

Villages in Paschim Bardhaman district